Maurice Deprez (born 1886, date of death unknown) was a Belgian ice hockey player. He was the top scorer at the Ice Hockey European Championship 1913 (7 goal in 3 matches), where his team won the gold medal; he finished third at the 1910 and 1914 European Championships and fifth at the 1920 Summer Olympics.

References

External links
 

1886 births
Date of death unknown
Ice hockey players at the 1920 Summer Olympics
Olympic ice hockey players of Belgium
Sportspeople from Brussels
Belgian ice hockey centres